Gonorrhea, colloquially known as the clap, is a sexually transmitted infection (STI) caused by the bacterium Neisseria gonorrhoeae. Infection may involve the genitals, mouth, or rectum. Infected men may experience pain or burning with urination, discharge from the penis, or testicular pain. Infected women may experience burning with urination, vaginal discharge, vaginal bleeding between periods, or pelvic pain. Complications in women include pelvic inflammatory disease and in men include inflammation of the epididymis. Many of those infected, however, have no symptoms. If untreated, gonorrhea can spread to joints or heart valves.

Gonorrhea is spread through sexual contact with an infected person. This includes oral, anal, and vaginal sex. It can also spread from a mother to a child during birth. Diagnosis is by testing the urine, urethra in males, or cervix in females. Testing all women who are sexually active and less than 25 years of age each year as well as those with new sexual partners is recommended; the same recommendation applies in men who have sex with men (MSM).

Gonorrhea can be prevented with the use of condoms, having sex with only one person who is uninfected, and by not having sex. Treatment is usually with ceftriaxone by injection and azithromycin by mouth. Resistance has developed to many previously used antibiotics and higher doses of ceftriaxone are occasionally required. Retesting is recommended three months after treatment. Sexual partners from the last two months should also be treated.

Gonorrhea affects about 0.8% of women and 0.6% of men. An estimated 33 to 106 million new cases occur each year, out of the 498 million new cases of curable STI – which also includes syphilis, chlamydia, and trichomoniasis. Infections in women most commonly occur when they are young adults. In 2015, it caused about 700 deaths. Descriptions of the disease date back to before the Common Era within the Hebrew Bible/Old Testament. The current name was first used by the Greek physician Galen before AD 200 who referred to it as "an unwanted discharge of semen".

Signs and symptoms
Gonorrhea infections of mucosal membranes can cause swelling, itching, pain, and the formation of pus. The time from exposure to symptoms is usually between two and 14 days, with most symptoms appearing between four and six days after infection, if they appear at all.  Both men and women with infections of the throat may experience a sore throat, though such infection does not produce symptoms in 90% of cases. Other symptoms may include swollen lymph nodes around the neck. Either sex can become infected in the eyes or rectum if these tissues are exposed to the bacterium.

Women
Half of women with gonorrhea are asymptomatic but the other half experience vaginal discharge, lower abdominal pain, or pain with sexual intercourse associated with inflammation of the uterine cervix. Common medical complications of untreated gonorrhea in women include pelvic inflammatory disease which can cause scars to the fallopian tubes and result in later ectopic pregnancy among those women who become pregnant.

Men
Most infected men with symptoms have inflammation of the penile urethra associated with a burning sensation during urination and discharge from the penis. In men, discharge with or without burning occurs in half of all cases and is the most common symptom of the infection. This pain is caused by a narrowing and stiffening of the urethral lumen. The most common medical complication of gonorrhea in men is inflammation of the epididymis. Gonorrhea is also associated with increased risk of prostate cancer.

Infants

If not treated, gonococcal ophthalmia neonatorum will develop in 28% of infants born to women with gonorrhea.

Spread
If left untreated, gonorrhea can spread from the original site of infection and infect and damage the joints, skin, and other organs. Indications of this can include fever, skin rashes, sores, and joint pain and swelling. In advanced cases, gonorrhea may cause a general feeling of tiredness similar to other infections. It is also possible for an individual to have an allergic reaction to the bacteria, in which case any appearing symptoms will be greatly intensified. Very rarely it may settle in the heart, causing endocarditis, or in the spinal column, causing meningitis. Both are more likely among individuals with suppressed immune systems, however.

Cause

Gonorrhea is caused by the bacterium Neisseria gonorrhoeae. Previous infection does not confer immunity – a person who has been infected can become infected again by exposure to someone who is infected. Infected persons may be able to infect others repeatedly without having any signs or symptoms of their own.

Spread
The infection is usually spread from one person to another through vaginal, oral, or anal sex. Men have a 20% risk of getting the infection from a single act of vaginal intercourse with an infected woman. The risk for men who have sex with men (MSM) is higher. Insertive MSM may get a penile infection from anal intercourse, while receptive MSM may get anorectal gonorrhea. Women have a 60–80% risk of getting the infection from a single act of vaginal intercourse with an infected man.

A mother may transmit gonorrhea to her newborn during childbirth; when affecting the infant's eyes, it is referred to as ophthalmia neonatorum. It may be able to spread through the objects contaminated with body fluid from an infected person. The bacteria typically does not survive long outside the body, typically dying within minutes to hours.

Risk factors

It is discovered that sexually active women younger than 25 and men who have sex with men are at increased risk of getting gonorrhea.

Other risk factors include:

 Having a new sex partner
 Having a sex partner who has other partners
 Having more than one sex partner
 Having had gonorrhea or another sexually transmitted infection

Complications 
Medically it has been said that Untreated gonorrhea can lead to major complications, such as:

 Infertility in women. Gonorrhea can spread into the uterus and fallopian tubes, causing pelvic inflammatory disease (PID). PID can result in scarring of the tubes, greater risk of pregnancy complications and infertility. PID requires immediate treatment.
 Infertility in men. Gonorrhea can cause a small, coiled tube in the rear portion of the testicles where the sperm ducts are located (epididymis) to become inflamed (epididymitis). Untreated epididymitis can lead to infertility.
 Infection that spreads to the joints and other areas of the body. The bacterium that causes gonorrhea can spread through the bloodstream and infect other parts of the body, including the joints. Fever, rash, skin sores, joint pain, swelling and stiffness are possible results.
 Increased risk of HIV/AIDS. Having gonorrhea increases the susceptibility to infection with human immunodeficiency virus (HIV), the virus that leads to AIDS. People who have both gonorrhea and HIV (untreated by anti-retroviral therapy) are able to pass both diseases more readily to their partners.
 Complications in babies. Babies who contract gonorrhea from their mothers during birth can develop blindness, sores on the scalp and infections.

Diagnosis

Traditionally, gonorrhea was diagnosed with Gram stain and culture; however, newer polymerase chain reaction (PCR)-based testing methods are becoming more common. In those failing initial treatment, culture should be done to determine sensitivity to antibiotics.

Tests that use PCR (aka nucleic acid amplification) to identify genes unique to N. gonorrhoeae are recommended for screening and diagnosis of gonorrhea infection. These PCR-based tests require a sample of urine, urethral swabs, or cervical/vaginal swabs. Culture (growing colonies of bacteria in order to isolate and identify them) and Gram-stain (staining of bacterial cell walls to reveal morphology) can also be used to detect the presence of N. gonorrhoeae in all specimen types except urine. The swab sample for gonorrhea infections does not show difference whether the sample was collected in home or in clinic in term of number patient treated. The implications in cured patient, reinfection, partner management, and safety are unknown.

If Gram-negative, oxidase-positive diplococci are visualized on direct Gram stain of urethral pus (male genital infection), no further testing is needed to establish the diagnosis of gonorrhea infection. However, in the case of female infection direct Gram stain of cervical swabs is not useful because the N. gonorrhoeae organisms are less concentrated in these samples. The chances of false positives are increased as Gram-negative diplococci native to the normal vaginal flora cannot be distinguished from N. gonorrhoeae. Thus, cervical swabs must be cultured under the conditions described above. If oxidase positive, Gram-negative diplococci are isolated from a culture of a cervical/vaginal swab specimen, then the diagnosis is made. Culture is especially useful for diagnosis of infections of the throat, rectum, eyes, blood, or joints—areas where PCR-based tests are not well established in all labs. Culture is also useful for antimicrobial sensitivity testing, treatment failure, and epidemiological purposes (outbreaks, surveillance).

In patients who may have disseminated gonococcal infection (DGI), all possible mucosal sites should be cultured (e.g., pharynx, cervix, urethra, rectum). Three sets of blood cultures should also be obtained. Synovial fluid should be collected in cases of septic arthritis.

All people testing positive for gonorrhea should be tested for other sexually transmitted diseases such as chlamydia, syphilis, and human immunodeficiency virus. Studies have found co-infection with chlamydia ranging from 46 to 54% in young people with gonorrhea. Among persons in the United States between 14 and 39 years of age, 46% of people with gonorrheal infection also have chlamydial infection. For this reason, gonorrhea and chlamydia testing are often combined. People diagnosed with gonorrhea infection have a fivefold increase risk of HIV transmission. Additionally, infected persons who are HIV positive are more likely to shed and transmit HIV to uninfected partners during an episode of gonorrhea.

Screening 

The United States Preventive Services Task Force (USPSTF) recommends screening for gonorrhea in women at increased risk of infection, which includes all sexually active women younger than 25 years. Extragenital gonorrhea and chlamydia are highest in men who have sex with men (MSM). Additionally, the USPSTF also recommends routine screening in people who have previously tested positive for gonorrhea or have multiple sexual partners and individuals who use condoms inconsistently, provide sexual favors for money, or have sex while under the influence of alcohol or drugs.

Screening for gonorrhea in women who are (or intend to become) pregnant, and who are found to be at high risk for sexually transmitted diseases, is recommended as part of prenatal care in the United States.

Prevention 

As with most sexually transmitted diseases, the risk of infection can be reduced significantly by the correct use of condoms, not having sex, or can be removed almost entirely by limiting sexual activities to a mutually monogamous relationship with an uninfected person.

Those previously infected are encouraged to return for follow up care to make sure that the infection has been eliminated. In addition to the use of phone contact, the use of email and text messaging have been found to improve the re-testing for infection.

Newborn babies coming through the birth canal are given erythromycin ointment in the eyes to prevent blindness from infection. The underlying gonorrhea should be treated; if this is done then usually a good prognosis will follow.

Treatment

Antibiotics

Antibiotics are used to treat gonorrhea infections. As of 2016, both ceftriaxone by injection and azithromycin by mouth are most effective. However, due to increasing rates of antibiotic resistance, local susceptibility patterns must be taken into account when deciding on treatment. Ertapenem is a potential effective alternative treatment for ceftriaxone-resistant gonorrhea.

Adults may have eyes infected with gonorrhoea and require proper personal hygiene and medications. Addition of topical antibiotics have not been shown to improve cure rates compared to oral antibiotics alone in treatment of eye infected gonorrhea. For newborns, erythromycin ointment is recommended as a preventative measure for gonococcal infant conjunctivitis.

Infections of the throat can be especially problematic, as antibiotics have difficulty becoming sufficiently concentrated there to destroy the bacteria. This is amplified by the fact that pharyngeal gonorrhoea is mostly asymptomatic, and gonococci and commensal Neisseria species can coexist for long time periods in the pharynx and share anti-microbial resistance genes. Accordingly, an enhanced focus on early detection (i.e., screening of high-risk populations, such as men who have sex with men, PCR testing should be considered) and appropriate treatment of pharyngeal gonorrhoea is important.

Sexual partners
It is recommended that sexual partners be tested and potentially treated. One option for treating sexual partners of people infected is patient-delivered partner therapy (PDPT), which involves providing prescriptions or medications to the person to take to his/her partner without the health care provider's first examining him/her.

The United States' Centers for Disease Control and Prevention (CDC) currently recommend that individuals who have been diagnosed and treated for gonorrhea avoid sexual contact with others until at least one week past the final day of treatment in order to prevent the spread of the bacterium.

Antibiotic resistance

Many antibiotics that were once effective including penicillin, tetracycline, and fluoroquinolones are no longer recommended because of high rates of resistance. Resistance to cefixime has reached a level such that it is no longer recommended as a first-line agent in the United States, and if it is used a person should be tested again after a week to determine whether the infection still persists. Public health officials are concerned that an emerging pattern of resistance may predict a global epidemic. In 2016, the WHO published new guidelines for treatment, stating "There is an urgent need to update treatment recommendations for gonococcal infections to respond to changing antimicrobial resistance (AMR) patterns of N. gonorrhoeae. High-level resistance to previously recommended quinolones is widespread and decreased susceptibility to the extended-spectrum (third-generation) cephalosporins, another recommended first-line treatment in the 2003 guidelines, is increasing and several countries have reported treatment failures."

Prognosis

Gonorrhea if left untreated may last for weeks or months with higher risks of complications. One of the complications of gonorrhea is systemic dissemination resulting in skin pustules or petechia, septic arthritis, meningitis, or endocarditis. This occurs in between 0.6 and 3% of infected women and 0.4 and 0.7% of infected men.

In men, inflammation of the epididymis, prostate gland, and urethra can result from untreated gonorrhea. In women, the most common result of untreated gonorrhea is pelvic inflammatory disease. Other complications include inflammation of the tissue surrounding the liver, a rare complication associated with Fitz-Hugh–Curtis syndrome; septic arthritis in the fingers, wrists, toes, and ankles; septic abortion; chorioamnionitis during pregnancy; neonatal or adult blindness from conjunctivitis; and infertility. Men who have had a gonorrhea infection have an increased risk of getting prostate cancer.

Epidemiology

About 88 million cases of gonorrhea occur each year, out of the 448 million new cases of curable STI each year – that also includes syphilis, chlamydia and trichomoniasis. The prevalence was highest in the African region, the Americas, and Western Pacific, and lowest in Europe. In 2013, it caused about 3,200 deaths, up from 2,300 in 1990.

In the United Kingdom, 196 per 100,000 males 20 to 24 years old and 133 per 100,000 females 16 to 19 years old were diagnosed in 2005. In 2013, the CDC estimated that more than 820,000 people in the United States get a new gonorrheal infection each year. Fewer than half of these infections are reported to CDC. In 2011, 321,849 cases of gonorrhea were reported to the CDC. After the implementation of a national gonorrhea control program in the mid-1970s, the national gonorrhea rate declined from 1975 to 1997. After a small increase in 1998, the gonorrhea rate has decreased slightly since 1999. In 2004, the rate of reported gonorrheal infections was 113. 5 per 100,000 persons.

In the US, it is the second-most-common bacterial sexually transmitted infections; chlamydia remains first. According to the CDC African Americans are most affected by gonorrhea, accounting for 69% of all gonorrhea cases in 2010.

The World Health Organization warned in 2017 of the spread of untreatable strains of gonorrhea, following analysis of at least three cases in Japan, France and Spain, which survived all antibiotic treatment.

History

Some scholars translate the biblical terms zav (for a male) and zavah (for a female) as gonorrhea.

It has been suggested that mercury was used as a treatment for gonorrhea. Surgeons' tools on board the recovered English warship the Mary Rose included a syringe that, according to some, was used to inject the mercury via the urinary meatus into crewmen with gonorrhea. The name "the clap", in reference to the disease, is recorded as early as the sixteenth century, referring to a medieval red-light district in Paris, Les Clapiers. Translating to "The rabbit holes", it was so named for the small huts in which prostitutes worked.

In 1854, Dr. Wilhelm Gollmann addressed gonorrhea in his book, Homeopathic Guide to all Diseases Urinary and Sexual Organs. He noted that the disease was common in prostitutes and homosexuals in large cities. Gollmann recommended the following as cures: aconite to cure "shooting pains with soreness and inflammation;" mercury "for stitching pain with purulent discharge;" nux vomica and sulphur "when the symptoms are complicated with hemorrhoids and stricture of the rectum. Other remedies include argentum, aurum (gold), belladonna, calcarea, ignatia, phosphorus, and sepia.

Silver nitrate was one of the widely used drugs in the 19th century. However, it became replaced by Protargol. Arthur Eichengrün invented this type of colloidal silver, which was marketed by Bayer from 1897 onward. The silver-based treatment was used until the first antibiotics came into use in the 1940s.

The exact time of onset of gonorrhea as prevalent disease or epidemic cannot be accurately determined from the historical record. One of the first reliable notations occurs in the Acts of the (English) Parliament. In 1161, this body passed a law to reduce the spread of "... the perilous infirmity of burning". The symptoms described are consistent with, but not diagnostic of, gonorrhea. A similar decree was passed by Louis IX in France in 1256, replacing regulation with banishment. Similar symptoms were noted at the siege of Acre by Crusaders.

Coincidental to, or dependent on, the appearance of a gonorrhea epidemic, several changes occurred in European medieval society. Cities hired public health doctors to treat affected patients without right of refusal. Pope Boniface rescinded the requirement that physicians complete studies for the lower orders of the Catholic priesthood.

Medieval public health physicians in the employ of their cities were required to treat prostitutes infected with the "burning", as well as lepers and other epidemic patients. After Pope Boniface completely secularized the practice of medicine, physicians were more willing to treat a sexually transmitted disease.

Research 
A vaccine for gonorrhea has been developed that is effective in mice. It will not be available for human use until further studies have demonstrated that it is both safe and effective in the human population. Development of a vaccine has been complicated by the ongoing evolution of resistant strains and antigenic variation (the ability of N. gonorrhoeae to disguise itself with different surface markers to evade the immune system).

As N. gonorrhoeae is closely related to N. meningitidis and they have 80–90% homology in their genetic sequences some cross-protection by meningococcal vaccines is plausible. A study published in 2017 showed that MeNZB group B meningococcal vaccine provided a partial protection against gonorrhea. The vaccine efficiency was calculated to be 31%.

References

External links 

 
 "Gonorrhea – CDC Fact Sheet"

Bacterium-related cutaneous conditions
Gonorrhea
Infectious causes of cancer
Wikipedia medicine articles ready to translate
Wikipedia emergency medicine articles ready to translate